Mablethorpe is a seaside town in the East Lindsey district of Lincolnshire, England, part of the civil parish of Mablethorpe and Sutton. The population including nearby Sutton-on-Sea was 12,531 at the 2011 census and estimated at 12,633 in 2019. The town was visited regularly by Alfred, Lord Tennyson, a 19th-century Poet Laureate of the United Kingdom. Some town features have been named after him, such as Tennyson Road and the now closed Tennyson High School.

History

Roman Empire
A horde of Roman treasure was found in Mablethorpe in the 1980s, as were a Roman brooch and pottery.

Mablethorpe Hall
Mablethorpe has existed as a town for many centuries, gaining its market town charter in 1253. Coastal erosion means some of it was lost to the sea in the 1540s. Records of the Fitzwilliam family of Mablethorpe Hall date back to the 14th century. In the 19th century, it was a centre for ship breaking in the winter. Mablethorpe Hall is to the west of the town along Alford Road near the Church of St Mary. The Mablethorpe church parish includes Trusthorpe.

Town lifeboats
In 1883 Mablethorpe's first lifeboat station was built, and ran until the First World War, when it closed temporarily due to crew shortages. These continued and the station closed permanently after the war. It reopened as an inshore lifeboat station in 1965. An additional station was opened in 1996. A D-class lifeboat, D-506 Patrick Rex Moren, went into service on 9 July 1996, followed in 2001 by a B-class Atlantic 75-class lifeboat, B–778 Joan Mary, and in 2005 by a more modern D-class lifeboat, D–653 William Hadley.

In 1998, a bronze medal was awarded to the helmsman for service on 12 April, when the lifeboat rescued a crew of two and saved the fishing vessel Lark, which had broken down in the surf and was drifting towards the shore without her anchor. The lifeboat was launched in a force 7 gale and a heavy swell – extreme conditions for this class. The helmsman had difficulty in negotiating the rough seas to reach the fishing boat, decided it was too hazardous to take off the crew and passed a line and towed her from danger – a considerable feat in huge seas for a lifeboat smaller than the fishing boat and powered by one 40-hp outboard engine.

East Coast floods
In 1953, Mablethorpe was hit by the disastrous East Coast floods. The seawall was breached on 31 January. A granite rock memorial was unveiled on the coast on 31 January 2013 on the 60th anniversary of the disaster, in memory of the town's 42 victims.

In literature

Mablethorpe is the destination for the fictional Morel family's first holiday in the still popular D. H. Lawrence novel, Sons and Lovers, published in 1913: "At last they got an answer from Mablethorpe, a cottage such as they wished for thirty shillings a week. There was immense jubilation. Paul was wild with joy for his mother's sake. She would have a real holiday now. He and she sat at evening picturing what it would be like. Annie came in, and Leonard, and Alice, and Kitty. There was wild rejoicing and anticipation. Paul told Miriam. She seemed to brood with joy over it. But the Morels' house rang with excitement."

Mablethorpe is the seaside setting for the Ted Lewis crime novel GBH, published in 1980. The novel was his last and has been described as a "lost masterwork".

Transport
Mablethorpe and much of east Lincolnshire lost its rail service in 1970 to the Beeching Axe, despite its long history. The station site is now the town's sports centre.

Stagecoach operate an hourly service to Skegness, as well as a service to Louth and Lincoln. Grayscroft Coaches operates several services from a base in Victoria Road. Brylaine runs a service between Mablethorpe and Alford and Spilsby, usually every two hours.

Lincolnshire County Council operates a demand-responsive CallConnect service linking remoter areas to connection points at Alford, Chapel St Leonards and Mablethorpe for mainline bus services.

Geography
Mablethorpe, in the East Lindsey council district, is administered with Sutton-on-Sea and Trusthorpe as the civil parish of Mablethorpe and Sutton. The original parish of Mablethorpe covers a rectangular area inland along Alford Road towards Maltby le Marsh, as far as Grange Leisure Park, where Earl's Bridge crosses West Bank. The south of the former parish follows the Trusthorpe Drains, which are crossed at Bamber's Bridge on Mile Lane. Out towards Alford lies Strubby Airfield, with the Strubby Aviation Club and Lincs Gliding Club. To the north is the large parish of Theddlethorpe St Helen, which extends to the River Great Eau at Saltfleetby. The town is the eastern terminus of the A52. The town is also accessed by the A1104 and A16 through Alford. The A157 heads west towards Louth  and is said to be the "sixth bendiest A-road in the UK".

Commerce
The town's one retail bank branch, Barclays, closed in July 2019. There are three supermarkets – a Co-op (which also includes a branch of Boyes), Lidl and from October 2021 the very first Tesco opened its doors. Branches of some high street chains are present, but most shops in Mablethorpe are independently operated. Market days vary through the year: Monday (Summer),Thursday (year round).

Leisure
Family attractions include a small fairground and an award-winning beach with traditional seaside amusement arcades and one of the largest family entertainment centers in England named The Mirage. One of Mablethorpe's long-standing features, its sand train, takes visitors to and from the northern end of the beach. Mablethorpe Seal Sanctuary and Wildlife Centre is also north of the town.

A Time and Tide Bell installed on the beach near the Seal Sanctuary in 2019 is one of a series around the UK, rung by high tides.

Mablethorpe's cinema, the Loewen in Quebec Road, was previously known as the Bijou. The Dunes leisure complex lies on Mablethorpe's seafront. The seafront also gained a skatepark in 2008, which includes a small funbox, a spine and two quarter pipes.

Several small caravan parks and guest houses provide tourist accommodation.

Electric power
Just over a mile north-east of the town, near the Seal Sanctuary, was the now-closed Theddlethorpe Gas Terminal, which supplied 5 per cent of the UK's gas. To the west is the Bambers wind farm, housing eight turbines and producing five MW of power since November 2004. An extension called Bambers II opened in November 2006 and produces an additional five MW of power. The two turbines of Mablethorpe wind farm, which produce 1.2 MW of power, were the first such in Lincolnshire when built in July 2002. All three wind farms are owned by Ecotricity and stand at the corner of West Bank and the Trusthorpe Drains. Mablethorpe's Star of the East is on the seafront.

Media
The local weekly newspapers are the Mablethorpe Leader and The Target. Radio coverage for Lincolnshire is provided by BBC Radio Lincolnshire and Lincs FM. In October 2012, volunteers created a local community radio station, Coastal FM.

Education
The community's primary school is Mablethorpe Primary Academy School. The Mablethorpe site of Monks' Dyke Tennyson College closed in August 2016.

Events

Mablethorpe hosts a unique beach-hut festival each September. Privately owned beach huts compete in outward design, amidst a backdrop of poetry, music, and drama.

Mablethorpe has long hosted motorbike sand racing each winter and spring. This has inspired the Lincolnshire Bike Week, following the Mablethorpe and Sutton-on-Sea Bike Nights.

Each summer Mablethorpe hosts an illuminations event (a "switch on"), for which a celebrity is invited. Those officiating have included Barbara Windsor, Timmy Mallett and Wolf and Hunter of Gladiators.

References

Further reading
Winston Kime, Mablethorpe and Sutton-on-Sea in Times Past, Skegness: C. H. Major & Co., 1990
Alfred J. Ludlam, Louth, Mablethorpe and Willoughby Loop, Locomotion Papers, no. 162, Oxford: Oakwood Press, 1987
Jeff Morris, The Story of the Mablethorpe and North Lincolnshire Lifeboats, Coventry: Lifeboat Enthusiasts' Society, 1989
A. E. B. Owen, "Coastal Erosion in East Lincolnshire", The Lincolnshire Historian, vol. 1, no. 9, 1952, pp. 330–341
A. E. B. Owen, "Salt, Sea Banks and Medieval Settlement on the Lindsey Coast", N. Field and A. White, eds, A Prospect of Lincolnshire, Lincoln: privately published, 1984, pp. 46–49
A. E. B. Owen, "Mablethorpe St Peter's and the Sea", Lincolnshire History and Archaeology, vol. 21 (1986), pp. 61–62
T. S. Patchett, The History of Mablethorpe County School, Mablethorpe: Mablethorpe County Primary School, 1968
Simon Pawley, "Lincolnshire Coastal Villages and the Sea c. 1300–c. 1600: Economy and Society", PhD thesis, University of Leicester, 1984
R. E. Pearson, "Railways in Relation to Resort Development in East Lincolnshire", East Midlands Geographer, vol. 4, 1968, pp. 281–295
David N. Robinson, The Book of the Lincolnshire Seaside: The Story of the Coastline from the Humber to the Wash, Barracuda, 1981
David N. Robinson, "The Changing Coastline", Dennis R. Mills (ed.), Twentieth Century Lincolnshire, History of Lincolnshire, no. 12, Lincoln: History of Lincolnshire Committee of the Society for Lincolnshire History and Archaeology, 1989, pp. 155–180
Ruth N. Neller, The Growth of Mablethorpe as a Seaside Resort, 1800–1939, Mablethorpe: SBK Books, 2000
Ruth N. Neller, "Skegness, Mablethorpe and Cleethorpes: contrasts of land ownership and investment in the development of seaside resorts", Lincolnshire History and Archaeology, vol. 47, 2012, pp. 35–47
Sally Scott, "The early days of planning", Dennis R. Mills, ed., Twentieth Century Lincolnshire, History of Lincolnshire, no. 12, Lincoln: History of Lincolnshire Committee of the Society for Lincolnshire History and Archaeology, 1989, pp. 181–211

External links

Mablethorpe's Town Website
The largest public collection of Mablethorpe photos and information
The Rotary Club of Alford and Mablethorpe
Business and Events directory for Mablethorpe and surrounding areas
Photo gallery for Mablethorpe, Trusthorpe, Sutton-On-Sea with images old and new
Photos of Skegness, Mablethorpe, Chapel St. Leonards from the past to present day
Visit Lincolnshire
Mablethorpe and Sutton Town Council
Mablethorpe Wind Farm
Coastal Community Challenge

News items
Star of the East in January 2007
Bambers Wind Farm opens in November 2004

Video clips
Seal sanctuary
Pathe newsreel, 1953, Flood victims evacuated to Mablethorpe
Pathe newsreel, 1953, Queen visiting flood victims in Tilbury & Mablethorpe
Pathe newsreel, 1955, Duke of Edinburgh visits flood defences

 
Seaside resorts in England
Towns in Lincolnshire
Populated coastal places in Lincolnshire
Beaches of Lincolnshire
Wind farms in England